Be Adam (Oh Man) is the first studio album by Turkish singer Gülşen. It was released by Raks Müzik on 1 July 1996. Following the release of the album, Milliyet wrote that Gülşen had made an ambitious start in her career. The album earned Gülşen a nomination in the Best Newcomer Female Artist category at the 3rd Kral TV Video Music Awards. The songs "Gel Çarem", "Be Adam", "Saz mı Caz mı?" and "Son Sözüm" were pieces from the album for which separate music videos were released.

Track listing

References

1996 debut albums
Gülşen (singer) albums